Giacomo Piccini (born 22 March 1985) is an Italian professional racing driver who most recently competed in the Michelin Le Mans Cup for Iron Lynx.

Team Management
On July 1, 2021, it was announced that Piccini would head the new joint project between Iron Lynx and Prema Powerteam under DC Racing Solutions.

References

Italian racing drivers
Living people
1985 births

BVM Racing drivers
Formula Renault Eurocup drivers
European Le Mans Series drivers
24H Series drivers
Graff Racing drivers
Euronova Racing drivers
Scuderia Coloni drivers
Italian Formula Three Championship drivers
Le Mans Cup drivers
Iron Lynx drivers